The 1994–95 Cypriot Third Division was the 24th season of the Cypriot third-level football league. Ethnikos Latsion FC won their 1st title.

Format
Fourteen teams participated in the 1994–95 Cypriot Third Division. All teams played against each other twice, once at their home and once away. The team with the most points at the end of the season crowned champions. The first four teams were promoted to the 1995–96 Cypriot Second Division.

Point system
Teams received three points for a win, one point for a draw and zero points for a loss.

League standings

Sources

See also
 Cypriot Third Division
 1994–95 Cypriot First Division
 1994–95 Cypriot Cup

Cypriot Third Division seasons
Cyprus
1994–95 in Cypriot football